A Rogue's Saga is a 1984 Soviet comedy film directed by Viktor Tregubovich.

Plot 
The film tells about an unusual employee of the research institute San Sanych Lyubomudrov, an extraordinary person who knows better than others how to communicate with unnecessary people.

Cast 
 Aleksandr Kalyagin as San Sanych Lyubomudrov
 Lyudmila Gurchenko as Ekaterina Ivanovna
 Tatyana Dogileva as Marina
 Irina Dymchenko as Natasha
 Viktor Zozulin as Viktor Viktorovich
 Igor Gorbachyov as Mikhail Mikhailovich
 Vladimir Soshalsky	 as  Timofei Timofeevich
 Yury Kuznetsov as Volodya
 Nikolai Ispolatov as  Platon
 Igor Nefyodov as Slavik
 Valentin Smirnitsky as Oleg Arbatov 
 Aleksei Zharkov as Kolya, waiter
 Anatoly Ravikovich as toastmaster at a wedding
 Alexander Ivanov as cameo

References

External links 
 

1984 films
1980s Russian-language films
Soviet comedy films
1984 comedy  films
Lenfilm  films
Films set in Moscow
Films about weddings
1980s business films

Soviet crime comedy films
1980s crime comedy films